Dávid Márkvárt (born 20 September 1994) is a Hungarian football player who plays for Vasas.

Club career
On 21 June 2021, Márkvárt signed with Vasas.

Club statistics

Updated to games played as of 20 May 2021.

References

External links
 HLSZ 
 MLSZ 

1994 births
Living people
People from Szekszárd
Hungarian footballers
Association football midfielders
Hungary international footballers
Pécsi MFC players
Puskás Akadémia FC players
Diósgyőri VTK players
Vasas SC players
Nemzeti Bajnokság I players
Nemzeti Bajnokság II players
Sportspeople from Tolna County